Sammy Davis Jr. Now is a 1972 album by Sammy Davis Jr. The album features the number one hit "The Candy Man", a Grammy-nominated song. The rest of the album is made up of standards, big ballads and soul tracks.

Reception

Eugene Chadbourne of AllMusic rated Sammy Davis Jr. Now one-and-a-half out of five stars. He stated that "there are tracks enough on this album that are painful to sit through", but also said that "The Candy Man" "surely will retain its historical value simply for being about the closest music has ever come to being pure excrement." He concluded his review by stating that "it is big enough for the artist himself to hide behind".

Track listing
 "The Candy Man" – 3:10 (covered from the film, Willy Wonka & the Chocolate Factory) (Leslie Bricusse, Anthony Newley) 
 "This is My Life" – 3:23 (Bruno Canfora)
 "I am Over 25 - But You Can Trust Me" – 3:24 (Mack David, Mike Curb)
 "Have a Little Talk with Myself" – 3:26 (Ray Stevens)
 "Willoughby Grove" – 3:58 (R.W. Scott, Danny Meehan)
 "Take My Hand" – 4:20 (J. O'Brien, B. James)
 "I'll Begin Again" – 2:35 (covered from the film, Scrooge) (Leslie Bricusse)
 "I Want to Be Happy" (Vincent Youmans, Irving Ceasar) – 2:45
 "MacArthur Park" (Jimmy Webb) – 7:30
 "Time to Ride" – 2:28 (Ray Charles, Mack David)
 "John Shaft" – 3:49 (covered from the film, Shaft) (Issac Hayes)

References

1972 albums
Sammy Davis Jr. albums
MGM Records albums
Albums produced by Jimmy Bowen
Albums produced by Don Costa
Albums produced by Mike Curb